The 1953–54 USC Trojans men's basketball team represented the University of Southern California during the 1953–54 NCAA college basketball season. Members of the Pacific Coast Conference, the Trojans were led by fourth-year head coach Forrest Twogood and played their home games off campus at Pan-Pacific Auditorium in Los Angeles, California.

They won the Southern Division for the first time since 1940 and met Northern Division champion Oregon State in the best-of-three PCC playoff series at Long Beach City College. USC won the first and third games and advanced to the 24-team NCAA tournament.

At the West Regional at Gill Coliseum in Corvallis, Oregon, the Trojans defeated Idaho State and Santa Clara (in double overtime). At the Final Four in Kansas City, Missouri, the Trojans dropped both games, to Bradley in the semifinals and Penn State in the consolation game.

NCAA tournament
Seeding in brackets
West Regional at Corvallis, Oregon
 Southern California 73, Idaho State 59
 Southern California 66, Santa Clara 65 (2OT)
Final Four at Kansas City, Missouri
Bradley 74, Southern California 72
Penn State 70, Southern California 61 – (Third-place game)

Rankings

NBA draft
One Trojan was selected in the 1954 NBA draft

References

External links
Sports Reference – USC Trojans: 1953–54 basketball season

Usc
Usc
USC Trojans men's basketball seasons
NCAA Division I men's basketball tournament Final Four seasons
USC Trojans
USC Trojans